The Commercial Office of Peru to Taipei represents interests of Peru in Taiwan in the absence of formal diplomatic relations, functioning as a de facto embassy. Its counterpart in Peru is the Taipei Economic and Cultural Representative Office in Peru in Lima.

History
Peru maintained a diplomatic mission in Beijing since the establishment of relations in 1874, while China's legation arrived in Lima only after the War of the Pacific. In 1944, the diplomatic status of the two countries was raised to embassy level, and high-level officials of the two countries exchanged frequent visits in the 1950s and 1960s. As a result of the Chinese Civil War, Peru closed its embassy in Beijing in 1946 due to its refusal to recognize the newly established People's Republic of China.

In 1971, the left-wing government of Juan Velasco Alvarado recognized the People's Republic of China and established diplomatic relations, leading the Republic of China to sever its relations with Peru. As such, the Peruvian embassy in Taipei closed on November 3, 1971, with Peru reopening its mission in Beijing.

After a 20-year period without an official representation, Peru opened its representative office in Taipei on March 3, 1994, located in the 16th floor of the TWTC International Trade Building. As of October 2022, Peru is the 5th largest commercial partner of Taiwan in Latin America.

See also
 Peru–Taiwan relations
 List of diplomatic missions in Taiwan
 List of diplomatic missions of Peru

References

Bibliography
 

Taipei
Peru
Peru–Taiwan relations